Iron Hill Brewery & Restaurant (Iron Hill) is a scratch brewery and craft restaurant founded in 1996 in Newark, Delaware.  The company is recognized for their craft kitchen concept and award-winning beers.

History 
Iron Hill was founded in 1996 by Kevin Finn, Mark Edelson, and Kevin Davies. Soccer friends, Finn and Edelson, enjoyed home brewing in the early 1990s; their love of beer inspired the duo to create a business plan for a future brew pub.

Finn and Edelson began raising money, researching the restaurant industry, and visiting location sites for a potential brew pub in the early 1990s. Eventually, the two invited Kevin Davies, a career restaurateur, as a third partner in their venture. Finn acquired money through family and an SBA loan to open the first Iron Hill Brewery & Restaurant on Main Street in Newark, Delaware.

The team estimated that the Newark restaurant would produce $2 million in sales within the first year, however their success in the college centric town produced an extra million in revenue, which can be attributed to food sales.

In 1998, Iron Hill opened a second location in West Chester, Pennsylvania. In May 2018, the restaurant opened its first location in the Southern U.S., in Greenville, South Carolina. Iron Hill launched th 20 for 20 initiative, in which it plans to have 20 locations open in 2020, including a restaurant in Atlanta, Georgia.

Origin of Iron Hill name and brand 
Finn discovered the geographic landmark, Iron Hill, in a Delaware book of maps, which explained the site's rich historical background. Finn, Edelson, and Davies chose the company's name after discovering that Iron Hill is considered the highest hill in Delaware and was the site of a significant battle during the Revolutionary War known as the Battle of Cooch's Bridge.

The company's mark is a bird holding barley and hops, which represents two main ingredients found in beer.

Products 

Iron Hill Brewery exclusively serves its own beers and offers new American cuisine. Each location brews a variety of beers that are influenced by the season. The brewery's goal is to focus on small batches of beer that are creative and in line with desirable styles and flavors. Currently, hop forward session IPAs are trending in America, and according to Edelson, the brewery aims to offer beers in line with this and other trends. The Philly cheesesteak egg roll is a popular item, and the Drunk Monk Burger was praised as "addictive" by the Harrisburg Patriot-News, which described it as "tremendously juicy." The menu also includes vegetarian and vegan options such as a hummus platter, vegetable penne, black bean vegetable burger, and several salads.

Awards 

Iron Hill has claimed 48 medals over 22 consecutive years at the Great American Beer Festival, along with several World Beer Cup and restaurant awards.

References

Beer brewing companies based in Delaware
American beer brands
Food and drink companies established in 1996
Restaurants established in 1996
1996 establishments in Delaware